Muir Group, based in Inverkeithing, Fife, is one of the largest privately owned property development company specialising in timber-framed construction of houses and apartments companies in Scotland.

History
A former joiner, John Muir, set up Muir Homes in 1973 after leaving his position as managing director of Scothomes, part of Scottish Homes.

References

External links
 Muir Homes official site
 Muir Group official site

Housebuilding companies of the United Kingdom
Companies based in Fife
Construction and civil engineering companies of Scotland
Privately held companies of Scotland
1973 establishments in Scotland
Construction and civil engineering companies established in 1973
Property companies of Scotland